Goblinfish may refer to:
Glyptauchen panduratus
Inimicus didactylus
Vespicula trachinoides